The Corsaires de Dunkerque are an ice hockey team in Dunkerque, France. They were founded in 1979, and play in the FFHG Division 1, the second level of French ice hockey. The Corsaires previously played in the Ligue Magnus.

History
The Corsaires de Dunkerque were formed in 1979. After playing in the FFHG Division 1 league through the nineties the team moved up to the Ligue Magnus for the start of the 2002-03 season. After surviving relegation in the 2003-04 season the Corsaires were relegated back to Division 1 due to financial reasons. In 2007 the team were sent to the Division 1 relegation round and were relegated to the FFHG Division 2 for the 2007-08 season. In their fourth season in Division 2 the Corsaires won the 2011 playoffs and earned promotion back to Division 2.

Players and personnel

Current roster
''Team roster for the 2014–15 season

Staff
François Rozenthal – Header coach and general manager
Franck Vanwormhoudt - President

References

External links
Club profile on eurohockey.com

1979 establishments in France
Sport in Dunkirk
FFHG Division 1
Ice hockey teams in France
Ice hockey clubs established in 1979